Sierra de María-Los Vélez Natural Park (Parque Natural de Sierra de María-Los Vélez) is a natural park of Spain.  It is situated in Almería province in the municipalities of Chirivel, Maria, Vélez-Blanco, Vélez-Rubio.

The park encompasses pine forests and supports a varied flora, including some species unique to the Sierra.

Fauna
There are 100 bird species, including 17 species of birds of prey, and the park was declared a Special Protection Area in 2002.  There is a butterfly subspecies of parnassius apollo, which can only be found in this area.

Archaeology
The area was inhabited in prehistoric times, and archaeological remains from Paleolithic and Neolithic times have been excavated.  Sites include:
the Neolithic hilltop fort at Cerro de las Canteras, near the Corneras river. 
 The Cueva de los Letreros (“Cave of the Signboards”), near Vélez Rubio, is famous for its cave paintings, and is part of a World Heritage Site, Rock Art of the Mediterranean Basin on the Iberian Peninsula.
La Cueva del Gabar near Vélez-Blanco also has cave paintings.

Notes

External links

Sierra María-Los Vélez Natural Park
 PARQUE NATURAL SIERRA MARÍA-LOS VÉLEZ
 Sierra María - Los Vélez Natural Park

Natural parks of Andalusia
Special Protection Areas of Spain
Protected areas established in 1987